Hachette India is the Indian arm of the publishing company Hachette, which is owned by the French group, Lagardère Publishing. It started operations in India in 2008, and is currently the second-largest publishing house in the country, behind Penguin India, for non-education books.

References

External links
 Official website

Book publishing companies of India
Indian subsidiaries of foreign companies
.
Publishing companies established in 2008